The total value of Norwegian games industry was US$328 million in 2018.
Norwegian games industry managed a turnover of $42 million (NOK 330 million) in 2014.
As of 2015, there are 140 companies in the whole sector with 565 people employed.

In 2020, Tencent, one of the world's biggest video and online gaming companies acquired the Norwegian video game developer Funcom for $148 million.

Video game companies from Norway

 4 Gladiators Studio
 Agens Games (Also apps & mobile games)
 Apt Games
 Audvyr Studio
 Funcom
 Hamar Game Collective (Founded by Sarepta Studio, Krillbite Studio, and Moondrop)
 Krillbite Studio
 Sarepta Studio
 Hyper Games (Also co-devs, edutainment & porting)
 Megapop Games (Also mobile)
 Misc Games
 Pineleaf Studio
 Proletary Games
 Red Thread Games
 Scape-IT AS
 Snowcastle Games
 Turbo Tape Games

Misc

 Corvid Studio (Design & audio)

Defunct video game companies from Norway

 Antagonist AS (Founded 2014. Inactive 2017? Staff moved to Audvyr Studio & Corvid Studio.)
 Artplant (Online games. Most employees from Russia then UK. Probably inactive after 2019?)
 Blink Studios (Founded 2011. Defunct 2015. Not the same as 2 other US studios.)
 Moondrop Games (Co-founder of Hamar GC. Founded 2009. Probably inactive after 2019.)
 Trollpants Game Studio (Founded 2014. Defunct 2016.)
 Twilight Zone Software (Founded 1996. Inactive after 1997.)

Video game publishers from Norway

 Rain Games AS (Publisher & dev. See NO wiki.)
 Snow Cannon Games
 Surrealist AS (Publisher & dev)

References